Tama Starr is an American businesswoman and author.

She is the president of Artkraft Strauss, located in Manhattan. Throughout the twentieth century, the company was the preeminent designer and creator of Times Square's signs and displays, and was also responsible for the annual midnight ball-lowering that signaled the arrival of the new year.

Starr is also known as a satirist and social commentator. Her work has appeared in the Wall Street Journal, Washington Post, Reader's Digest, Partisan Review, Reason Magazine, and elsewhere.  She has published three books.  She lives in New York City.

Works

Books

Lyrics

Selected articles
 The 7.63 Percent Solution: A small contractor learns affirmative action arithmetic - Reason Magazine
 Confessions of a "Woman-Owned Business" Owner: How I learned to love quotas - Reason Magazine
 April Frauds: Three manufactured holidays make fools of us all - Reason Magazine (Earth Day, Secretary's Day, Take Your Daughter to Work Day)
 The Sky Keeps Falling! - Wall Street Journal (Review of Max Page, The City's End)

External links
 Artkraft Strauss listing and photo
 

American non-fiction writers
Year of birth missing (living people)
Living people